Péage Island is a small rocky island  southwest of Cape Découverte. Charted in 1951 by the French Antarctic Expedition and named by them for its position, which seems to command access to the Curzon Islands for parties arriving from Port Martin, péage being French for toll booth.

See also 
 List of Antarctic and sub-Antarctic islands

References

Islands of Adélie Land